"Mesmerize" is a song by American rapper Ja Rule. It was released on December 16, 2002, as the second single from his fourth studio, album The Last Temptation (2002). Contains a sample from the 1974 song "Stop, Look, Listen (To Your Heart)" by Diana Ross and Marvin Gaye, the song was produced by Irv Gotti and features R&B artist Ashanti. The song peaked at number two on the Billboard Hot 100 in February 2003, making it Ashanti's and Ja Rule's fourth top-10 hit as a duet.

Music video
Inspired by the musical number "You're the One that I Want" from the 1978 musical film Grease, the music video begins with a group of men dressed in black discussing their plan for a revolution in a strategy room. Ja Rule enters dressed in a preppy sweater, greatly surprising the other men, and explains that his girl wants him to forsake the street life. Meanwhile, some of Ashanti's friends are having a slumber party (with the Ashanti album cut "Movies" playing in the background) and playing scrabble when Ashanti emerges dressed in flashy black leather attire, explaining that her guy wants her to be more street.

The song begins with the two meeting up at an amusement fair. As they sing, they partake in various carnival attractions, such as game booths and bumper cars. The song ends abruptly with Ja Rule's friends emerging from a black van and asking him if he's riding with them. After he hesitates and turns to Ashanti, she accepts. They enter the van and after a few quick cuts they emerge and Ja Rule begins rapping "Destiny", the closing track from the album. The video ends with a crowd of men marching the streets and holding up various signs, including tributes to late rappers Tupac Shakur and DJ Jam-Master Jay from Run-D.M.C.

The street scene was filmed outside Cathedral High School on Bishops Road (formerly Stadium Way), an up-hill climb towards Dodger Stadium. The carnival scenes were filmed in Los Angeles at Cathedral High School's graveyard field. The entire campus was the site of the old Calvary Cemetery, Northeast of downtown Los Angeles.

Charts

Weekly charts

Year-end charts

Certifications

Release history

References

2002 songs
2003 singles
Ashanti (singer) songs
Def Jam Recordings singles
Ja Rule songs
Song recordings produced by Irv Gotti
Songs written by Irv Gotti
Songs written by Ja Rule
Songs written by Linda Creed
Songs written by Thom Bell
Songs written by Chink Santana